Varnam-e Bala (also Romanized as Varnām-e Bālā; also known as Varnām and Varnām-e ‘Olyā) is a village in Garmab Rural District, Chahardangeh District, Sari County, Mazandaran Province, Iran. At the 2006 census, its population was 67, in 18 families.

References 

Populated places in Sari County